Bala-Muradkhan is a village in the Kurdamir Rayon of Azerbaijan (AJ).

References 

Populated places in Kurdamir District